The Peruvian thick-knee (Burhinus superciliaris) is a species of bird in the family Burhinidae. It is found in Chile, Ecuador, and Peru. Its natural habitats are subtropical or tropical dry shrubland, subtropical or tropical seasonally wet or flooded lowland grassland, and pastureland. It is a ground-dwelling bird and feeds on insects and small animals.

Taxonomy
The Peruvian thick-knee was formally described in 1843 by the Swiss naturalist Johann Jakob von Tschudi from a specimen collected in the coastal region of Peru. He coined the binomial name Oedicnenus superciliaris (the genus name is a typographic error for Oedicnemus). The specific epithet is Modern Latin meaning "eyebrowed" (supercillium is the Latin word for "eyebrow"). The Peruvian thick-knee is now placed in the genus Burhinus that was erected in 1811 by the German zoologist Johann Karl Wilhelm Illiger. The species is monotypic: no subspecies are recognised.

Description
This medium-sized bird has brownish-grey plumage with brown streaks and spots. The underparts are white and the legs are yellow and long. There is a white streak through the eye with a black upper border. The short beak has a black tip.

Distribution and habitat
The Peruvian thick-knee is found in South America in the coastal strip between the Pacific Ocean and the Andes. Its range extends from northern Chile, through Peru to southern Ecuador. Its typical habitat is semi-desert areas, agricultural land, dry pasture or well-vegetated river valleys. It particularly favours open crops such as alfalfa or corn.

Behaviour
The Peruvian thick-knee is most active at night. The diet is not known but the bird moves about on the ground foraging, probably feeding on insects, small lizards and other small animals. It runs across the ground in a manner similar to an ostrich. It roosts in the open during the day, remaining motionless and difficult to spot as it is well-camouflaged by its brownish plumage. Its presence in an area may be most easily detected by its distinctive three-toed footprints in soft sand, and at night by its calls which are somewhat reminiscent of a lapwing (Vanellus sp.).

Little is known of the reproduction of this species but a nest containing two eggs has been observed in June on the Cerros de Naupe, a range of low mountains in Peru. The nesting site was on a dry, sparsely-vegetated slope with clumps of shrubs and cacti. The nest was a scrape in the ground with the area around it cleared of debris. One parent was incubating the eggs while the other stood in the shade a few metres away.

Status
The IUCN has listed the Peruvian thick-knee as being of "least concern". This is because, although it is confined to a somewhat restricted range the bird is quite common, especially in the northern part of that range, and although the population trend is unknown, the bird does not appear to qualify for a more threatened category.

References

Peruvian thick-knee
Birds of Peru
Peruvian thick-knee
Taxonomy articles created by Polbot
Taxa named by Johann Jakob von Tschudi